Julien Loisel (10 September 1890 – 31 May 1963) was a French racing cyclist. He rode in the 1920 Tour de France.

References

1890 births
1963 deaths
French male cyclists
Place of birth missing